Uyanış: Büyük Selçuklu is a Turkish historical drama television series, written by Serdar Özönalan, directed by Sedat İnci and produced by Emre Konuk. It focuses on the life of Malik-Shah I, and his son, Ahmad Sanjar. It tells the story of the Seljuk Empire's structure, political events and how it became an Islamic state. In the series Turkish actor Buğra Gülsoy portrays Sultan Malik-Shah, and Ekin Koç portrays Sanjar. The television series premiered on 28 September 2020 and ended on 31 May 2021.

The series was filmed on the TRT International Film Studios at various locations including Sakarya, Istanbul and Kocaeli. Turkish musician Gökhan Kırdar composed the opening theme while Kazakh musicians composed other music using instruments from the Turkic world. The television series went through a 13-month preparation time in which details were meticulously planned, although The Great Seljuks: Guardians of Justice includes a few historical inaccuracies. In 2021, the production company Akli Film was accused of mistreating its set workers. The television series has been heavily impacted by the COVID-19 pandemic in Turkey.

The show has been well received in Turkey, being called a "record-breaking television series", and has been compared with other series. The Great Seljuks: Guardians of Justice gained popularity in Turkey because of the casting of famous actors, and it has become popular in countries like Bangladesh, Pakistan and Kyrgyzstan. The show won the Anatolia Media Awards in 2020, while Konuk won the Crystal Globe Awards in the same year. A prequel series, Alparslan: Büyük Selçuklu, focusing on the life of Alp Arslan, was released on 8 November 2021.

It has only one season.

Premise
The show depicts the rise of the Seljuks under Sultan Malik-Shah I and his son Ahmad Sanjar, later Sultan of the Seljuk Empire. It focuses on their struggles and battles against Hassan-i Sabbah, leader of the Order of Assassins (dubbed the "Batinis"), the Byzantine Empire and fellow rival states that seek to weaken the Seljuks. Sencer has seen Turna Hatun, daughter of an Emir, who refuses to give her to him in marriage, but finally relents. Melikshah is married to Terken and Zubeyde. Terken is heavily pregnant with her son, and Elcin Hatun has come to the palace. She is jealous of Elcin, lest she may marry Malik-shah and give him a son, therefore he will lose attention in Terken. When she tries to prove that and is not good and goes to where Melikshah is. She is urging the driver to go faster and faster but then the horses skid and drop the carriage. Terken is taken back to the palace when her daughter and ordered to stay in bed till her baby is born. She gets up trying to go after Elcin in her dream. While she is running after what she sees, her water breaks and she goes in labour. She gives birth to a son who dies after birth. Afterwards she gets pregnant again and she gives birth screaming, but the baby lives. Meanwhile they find out that Melik-Shah's wife who everybody even Melik-Shah thought was dead is alive. She is the mother of Spencer and Tapar. Melik-Shah at first is very angry but then he calms down. 

Tapar's wife Gevher also gives birth to a girl named Fatima. Later on Turna gives birth to a girl called Zeynep. They go for a big war, eventually conquering Queli Castle. The drama finishes with Sencer and Tapar leaving Isfahan and becoming Emirs.

Cast 
Many of the characters are fictionalized depictions of Seljuk historical figures.

Main

 Buğra Gülsoy as Sultan Malik-Shah I, 3rd ruler of the Great Seljuk Empire. Despite filming during the COVID-19 pandemic, Gülsoy brought his family to the set to celebrate his birthday. In an interview with Anadolu Ajansı, Gülsoy reflected that he believed young people were becoming more interested in the Seljuk history because of the show.
 Ekin Koç as Ahmed Sencer, based on Ahmad Sanjar, the son of Malik-Shah I. Ahmed has become a fan-favorite character because of his strong sense of self. In the show he is depicted as the "bravest hero of the Seljuk state". Filming of the episode "Selçuklu Demek" was delayed after Koç tested positive for COVID-19.
 Hatice Şendil as Terken Hatun, a character based on Terken Khatun, the wife of Malik-Shah I. Terken tries to dominate the Seljuk state after her marriage to Melikşah. Şendil praised the extent of COVID-19 precautions the production put in place.
 Gürkan Uygun as Hasan Sabbah, the show's primary antagonist, based on Hassan-i Sabbah, founder of the Nizari Ismaili state.
 Sevda Erginci as Turna Hatun, based on Terken Khatun (Ahmad Sanjar's wife) who is Sencer's lover and later his wife.
 Mehmet Özgür appears as Nizamülmülk, a character based on Nizam al-Mulk, a vizier of the Seljuk Empire. The character's depiction has been criticised by history professor Muharrem Kesik for its historical inaccuracies, and for the incongruities between the character's role and the real duties of a vizier; in one episode, Nizâmülmülk is seen performing an autopsy, which a surgeon would have undertaken.
 Sezin Akbaşoğulları as Zübeyde Hatun, a character based on Zubayda Khatun, another of Malik-Shah I's wives.

Recurring
 İlker Kızmaz as Arslantaş Alp, a character based on Emir Arslantaş, one of Malik-Shah's commanders.
 Ali Gözüşirin as Muhammed Tapar, a character based on Muhammad I Tapar, the son of Malik-Shah I.
 Pınar Töre as Başulu Hatun, a character based on Tâcettin Seferiye Hatun who is the mother of Ahmed and Muhammed, and Melikşah's wife.
  as Ömer Hayyam, a character based on Omar Khayyam, an Iranian poet and philosopher who advised Malik-Shah. Following Ömer's appearance on the show, there has been renewed interest in the works of Khayyam.
 Leyla Feray as Gevher Hatun, Tapar's wife, based on Gawhar Khatun.
 Volkan Keskin as Bozkuş, a fictional character, a soldier serving Sencer.
 Mehmet Bozdoğan as Tâcülmülk, a character based on Taj al-Mulk, a vizier of the Seljuk Empire. His loyalty lies with Terken.
 Buse Meral as Mâh Melek Hatun, based on the real daughter of Terken Khatun and Malik-Shah, although there is little information about her.
 Cemal Toktaş as Gazzâlî, a character based on Islamic philosopher Al-Ghazali, in the series he is shown as a disciple of Yusuf Hemedanî.
 Özer Tunca as Yusuf Hemedanî, a character based on the Islamic philosopher Yusuf Hamadani, his depiction in the series is similar, but portrayed as extremely holy.
 İsmail Ege Şaşmaz as Faysal, a fictional character who acts as Hasan Sabbah's spy in the Seljuk Empire.
 Buçe Buse Kahraman as Livya, a fictional character who enters the Seljuk state as an innocent young woman, but with intentions of destroying it.
 Kaan Taşaner as Mitras, a fictional character from the Byzantine Empire who vows to destroy the Turks, leading him to be an enemy of Melikşah.
 Kaan Taşaner as Marcus, Mitras's twin brother who appears after his death.
 Janbi Ceylan as Aydoğdu, a fictional character shown to be loyal to Ahmed.
 Taner Turan as Emir İlteber, a fictional character who is shown as the father of Turna Hatun, and a man appointed by the Seljuks to watch over Şelemzar.
 Çiğdem Selışık Onat as Seferiye Hatun, based on Safariyyah Khatun. The wife of Alp Arslan and mother of Melikşah, Seferiye is based on Alp Arslan's real wife, though little is known about her.
 Leyla Lydia Tuğutlu as Elçin Hatun, the daughter of Kutalmışoğlu Süleyman Şah and sister of Kılıçarslan who seeks to wreak havoc in the Seljuk palace. The character was described as "attractive", which was criticized for objectifying women, especially as this would not have been said during the period.
 Nik Xhelilaj as Yorgos, a fearless Byzantine commander who sees the Seljuks and the Turks as those who are responsible for his brother's death resulting in him hating them. Xhelilaj is an Albanian actor.
 Osman Sonant as Andreas, a fictional character who is the commander of a Byzantine castle.
 Aytek Şayan as Rüstem, a fictional character who was taken from his parents as a child by the Batinis (Hasan Sabbah's men; assassins) and raised as a militant, he becomes one of the most dedicated Batinis. He is Arslantaş's long-lost brother.
 Ertuğrul Postoğlu as Korkut Ata, a character based on Korkut Ata, a semi-mythical scholar. In the series, he is shown as the Bey of the Kınık tribe.
  as Behram, a fictional character shown to be Hasan Sabbah's assistant.

Guest

  as Sultan Alparslan, a character based on Alp Arslan, a ruler of the Great Seljuk Empire.
  as Turanşah, Melikşah's hostile cousin and son of Qavurt. The character based on Turan Shah I of Kirman. Kaptanoğlu's guest appearance was announced by journalist Birsen Altuntaş before it was confirmed.
 Abdül Süsler as Baturalp Bey, the Bey of the Kipchaks and brother of Başulu Hatun.

Episodes

Production 
The series has attracted attention with its actors, costumes, historical locations and story. The Great Seljuks: Guardians of Justice is written by Serdar Özönalan, directed by Sedat İnci and produced by Emre Konuk. After three years of scenario work, every detail was meticulously prepared over 13 months. 350 décor employees, 100 carpenters and a team of 60 people took part on two separate backlots, in which many locations in the series were built. 5000 accessories and costumes, of which 3500 pieces belong to the period, were manufactured in special costume workshops. The Great Seljuks: Guardians of Justice is the most costly television series produced in Turkey after Diriliş: Ertuğrul. Two cities are built on three backlots and the enormous budget also includes construction fees and the actors' fees. It is produced by Akli Film, a production company new to the Turkish television industry who has been working with TRT for three years. The production company says that it has a guaranteed contract with TRT for at least 33 episodes or one season. If the series continues, it is expected to have five or six seasons.

Casting
The series includes many popular Turkish actors including Buğra Gülsoy, one of the lead actors, who was noted to have celebrated his birthday on set with his family. After Barış Arduç met with the producer of The Great Seljuks: Guardians of Justice, he was expected to join the cast. When Hatice Şendil, who portrays the role of Terken Hatun, was asked if Arduç would be joining the cast in the season finale, she said, "I don't know, but I think he will be [joining the cast]". Arduç is still rumoured to appear in the series in the role of Berkyaruk. The cast of another popular Turkish television series Çukur have been said by Turkish media to be leaving the series "one by one" to join The Great Seljuks: Guardians of Justice. The television series also cast an Albanian actor Nik Xhelilaj to play the role of Yorgos. Buğra Gülsoy, and other members of the cast were interviewed about what they thought of the show. Gülsoy said, "I think that the new generation has started to investigate the Seljuk period again thanks to the series." It was also rumoured that Kenan İmirzalıoğlu, who is interested in history, would join the series' cast however, he responded to these theories in an announcement saying that he wouldn't be joining. Birsen Altuntaş reported in May 2021 that Sevda Erginci and İsmail Ege Şaşmaz would leave the series after the first season, but Abdul Süsler would join the series in the final episodes in the role of "Kıpçak Bey".

Training 
The actors received horse riding and sword training by the action director of the Kazakh Nomad Stunts team, who choreographed Hollywood movies for a month. The actors, who worked on fitness, continuity and coordination, went through a challenging training program in this process. Janbi Ceylan, who portrays Aydoğdu, was also responsible for the horse-training of the cast.

Filming
According to the producer , the series is filmed on the TRT International Film Set" It was specifically filmed at various locations including Sakarya, Istanbul and Kocaeli. The Great Seljuks: Guardians of Justice came to the screen with the longest battle scene and production details in Turkish television history. A total of 400 actors, excluding the main ones, 100 of them on horseback, took part in the battle scene. Preparation took 60 days, and the shooting took eight days. The actors received horse riding and sword training by the action director of the Kazakh Nomad Stunts team, who choreographed Hollywood movies for a month. The actors who worked on fitness, continuity and coordination went through a challenging training program during this process.

For the battle scene in the first episode, 45 stuntmen and 120 supporting actors were given tough action and choreography training by Nomad Stunts for 15 days at the shooting location. During the shootings, ambulances, medical teams and veterinarians were present in case of any negative situation. The horse trainers provided by the Nomad Stunt team travelled around various cities of Anatolia, and only 15 horses among 150 horses, which were available for training, were included in the project. Horses were trained for a period of one month. Archery training was provided to the cast by a different company. In 2021, around 260 set workers left their jobs accusing Akli Film of leaving them with difficult working conditions, lack of payment, lack of hygiene and being subject to mobbing. Although the production company promised to solve the issues experienced by the set-décor workers, Turkish media said they took no action. Organisations later took notice criticising Akli Film and asking them to listen to their demands as soon as possible. In a statement, Konuk said that Azerbaijani Culture Minister Anar Karimov visited the set. According to journalist Birsen Altuntaş, the first season of the series will end with 36 episodes, while other sources say that the same journalist said that there will be 33 episodes.

Impact of the COVID-19 pandemic 

Much to fans' disappointment, TRT 1 suspended filming of the show for five days which delayed the release of the 26th episode for a week after a COVID-19 outbreak at the set. TRT officials said the film  would be broadcast instead on TRT 1 for the first time. The statement released was;As a result of regular tests of our series' cast and crew, COVID-19 cases were detected on the set of The Great Seljuks: Guardians of Justice. The health of our quarantined set workers is good and closely monitored. The news was shared with our cast and all our set staff and it was decided to suspend filming of our series for 5 days. Due to this mandatory break, the new episode of The Great Seljuks: Guardians of Justice will not be broadcast on Monday 22 March 2021. On the same day and time, the film Pocket Hercules: Naim Süleymanoğlu, for the first time on TV, will be on TRT 1 screens. We would like to thank our viewers in advance for their understanding and support. It is announced with respect for the public."There were rumours that the season was ending however, the episode later premiered on 29 March 2021. It was later announced after a few days that filming "Selçuklu Demek" was delayed when Ekin Koç, who portrays the role of Ahmed Sencer, tested positive for the disease. Hatice Şendil, who portrays Terken Hatun, praised the COVID-19 precautions made by The Great Seljuks: Guardians of Justice. Because of the rise of COVID-19 cases in Turkey, the production of the 29th episode was also delayed.

Music 

While the compositions for the series were prepared to reflect the atmosphere of the scenes, the music was played with the instruments used in the Turkic world. Musicians who performed using Central Asian instruments such as the dombra, kyl kyyak, komuz, and sybyzgy were featured in the works supported by master musicians in Kazakhstan and Kyrgyzstan. Kazakh composer Ercan Arkabay, who starred in the Kuruluş: Osman series, also said that he will be doing something for The Great Seljuks: Guardians of Justice. The album of first season music was released on 30 October 2020. In a statement, Gökhan Kırdar, one of the composers, stated that he was happy that he was involved in a great project that would reflect the period in which a unique civilization was built. The eulogy performed by the disciples of Gazzâlî was sung by Turkish musician Mehmet Öncel. Ermek Kazıbekov, a member of the team of Kyrgyz youth dubbing the series in their native language, said that he was impressed by the fact that traditional Kyrgyz instruments were used in the series. There are 71 tracks. The first track is by Gökhan Kırdar, nine tracks are by Hassak, a world-famous Kazakh band that were there to add "colour" to the songs, and the rest are by Batuhan Fırat. This is a list of selected songs:

While the compositions of the series were prepared according to the atmosphere of the stages, the music was played with the instruments used in the Turkic world. Musicians who performed using Central Asian instruments such as dombra, bristle, komuz, and sibizgi were featured in the works supported by master musicians in Kazakhstan and Kyrgyzstan. The album was released on 30 October 2020.

Historical accuracy 
Emre Konuk confirmed he had to do a lot of research on the historical figures presented in the series. However, the TV series has a few historical inaccuracies. One is that the Seljuk state has been shown to be run by a nomadic tribe and that the Seljuks began to shed blood from the first episode when they actually were a people of peace. Turkish media has accepted that The Great Seljuks: Guardians of Justice is not a documentary but a historical TV series meaning and can include many fictionalised features.

Reception
Like other Turkish TV series revolving around history, The Great Seljuks: Guardians of Justice has been popular in Bangladesh and Pakistan. It was also well received in Kyrgyzstan. A group of Kyrgyz youth decided to dub the series in their native language.

Critical response
The 13th episode attracted great attention with a particular scene and the 23rd episode of the "record-breaking TV series" was eagerly awaited by Turkish fans. The series, whose first episode reached the top of the ratings in Turkey, was so well-received  it was the only Turkish TV series to be included in the daily hits section of newspaper The Wit. Arab journalist Mohammed Abu Rumman compared it with other Turkish television series including Kuruluş: Osman, Kurtlar Vadisi, Payitaht: Abdülhamid and Diriliş: Ertuğrul, which became popular globally. As mentioned, the television series has been well received in Bangladesh. Speaking to Anadolu Ajansi, a Bengali professor stated that the Turkish television series revolved around history, including The Great Seljuks: Guardians of Justice should be watched by people of all ages. Muharrem Kesik says that The Great Seljuks: Guardians of Justice, which contains many historical inaccuracies, is not a documentary but a historical TV series meaning that it can include many fictionalised features.

Accolades

See also 
 List of Islam-related films
 List of Turkish television series
 Television in Turkey

Notes

References

External links
 (in Turkish)

Uyanış: Büyük Selçuklu at Akli Film (in Turkish)

 
2020 Turkish television series debuts
Isfahan in fiction
Television series about Islam
Television series produced in Istanbul
Television series set in the 11th century
Turkish action television series
Turkish drama television series
Turkish historical television series
Turkish Radio and Television Corporation original programming
Turkish-language television shows
War drama television series